Taloli (alternatively Talavali) is a village in India.  It has a population of about 3000.  The village has a mosque called Jama Masjid Ahle-Hadess, Taloli [1]. The villagers are Muslims following authentic Salaf us Saalih creed (normally called Ahl al-Hadith in the sub-continent. Translation of "Ahl al-Hadith" is "Followers of the traditions and sayings of Muhammad".)
It is a small rustic town about 8–10 km from Bhiwandi.

References

[1] https://www.youtube.com/channel/UCCZWQ5QcYF6lydhE1ZX_N-w/featured

Villages in Thane district